Ian Henry Murray Marsh (born 8 December 1948) is an English musician and composer, best known as a member of the pop group Sailor.

Marsh was born in Bath, Somerset. He was educated at Sherborne School and New College, Oxford.

Career
Marsh's first group was at school; Jeremy Irons was the drummer.
After Oxford, Marsh joined a group with, among others, John G. Perry, at first called Toast, which expanded to become Gringo. He was invited in 1973 by Phil Pickett to join a group called 
Kajanus Pickett, after Pickett and Georg Kajanus. The group became Sailor with the inclusion of Grant Serpell. Sailor's original line-up split up in 1978, although Pickett and Marsh released more material as Sailor with Gavin and Virginia David in 1980, with an album of Pickett compositions called Dressed for Drowning.

After Sailor disbanded, he worked with Kajanus on DATA and "And The Mamluks", a short-lived electronic-music project. Marsh eventually teamed up with writer Barry Mason in 1986. They and David H. Bell, a Broadway director, wrote a musical called Malibu, first performed in 1991. He wrote another musical, Casper—The Musical, with Pickett in 1999. Marsh has written musical scores for theatre productions including Romeo and Juliet, The Grapes of Wrath and The Dark at the Top of the Stairs. He received the Joseph Jefferson Award for Best Original Music in Theater Production in 1998 for The Comedy of Errors, and in 1999 for Much Ado About Nothing. He also received a best composer nomination for As You Like It in 2002. In 2004 he was nominated for two Jefferson Awards for The Taming of the Shrew and A Midsummer Night's Dream.

His musical theatre work in the USA includes One Last Summer, In Stitches and Female Problems for which he received a nomination for Best New Work. His musical theatre work in the UK includes The Mask, Spider-Man and Casper. Marsh has composed numerous scores for television. These include Eye of the Storm (ITV drama), Pirates (BBC drama), Blockbusters, Strike It Rich, Black Date (Channel 4), Win Lose Or Draw (Scottish Television), The Fastest Man On Earth (ITV and Discovery Channel) and House Invaders (BBC). His library music has been used worldwide for film and television, including The Fresh Prince of Bel-Air, Private Parts, Father Ted, Home and Away, Peak Practice and many others. He composed the music for the film SON of Nosferatu (2011).

In 1989 Sailor reformed with Marsh. He left in 1999 but returned in 2005. Marsh's sons, Oliver and Thomas, have also performed with the band in recent years.

Personal life
In April 1970 Marsh married Susan Norddahl; they had two sons and a daughter before their divorce. Marsh subsequently married Patricia "Dee Dee" Wilde, founder member of Pan's People. They jointly run WM Productions, a video production company. As of 2002, they lived in Rood Ashton, Wiltshire. Marsh has been practising Transcendental Meditation since the early 1980s; Wilde is also a practitioner.

References

External links
Photo, discography

1948 births
Alumni of New College, Oxford
English composers
Living people
People educated at Sherborne School